Cirrhochrista semibrunnea is a moth in the family Crambidae. It was described by George Hampson in 1896. It is found in Bhutan<ref</ref> and India.

The wingspan is about 36 mm. The forewings are brown, with a large white patch on the basal inner area, as well as a white crescent in the cell and a larger similar mark beyond the cell. There is also a quadrate apical white patch, a yellow discocellular line and a series of yellow marginal marks below the apical patch. The hindwings are white with a large brown submarginal spot and some yellow on the medial part of the margin, as well as a brown marginal line.

References

Moths described in 1896
Spilomelinae
Moths of Asia